William Howard Lancaster (April 29, 1931 – January 2, 2000) was a member of the California State Assembly for the 62nd district from 1972 to 1992.

Lancaster was born in Bakersfield, California and raised in Sacramento, California and Los Angeles County. He entered politics with election to the Duarte, California city council in 1958.  He also served several terms as mayor of that city.

Lancaster was elected to the California State Assembly in a special election in June 1972.  The election was held because Pete Schabarum had resigned to become a member of the Los Angeles County Board of Supervisors.  Lancaster represented a district that covered eastern Los Angeles County and western San Bernardino County including the cities of Covina and Upland.  He served in office until 1992.

Sources
register of Lancaster papers from the California State Archives

References

External links

1931 births
Republican Party members of the California State Assembly
Politicians from Sacramento, California
Politicians from Bakersfield, California
Mayors of places in California
2000 deaths